Campsomeris is a Neotropical genus of the family Scoliidae, also known as the scoliid wasps. They are generally parasites of beetle larvae, most often of Scarabaeidae.

Species 
Species within this genus include:

Campsomeris atrata (Fabricius, 1775)
Campsomeris bistrimacula (Lepeletier, 1845)
Campsomeris dohrni (Mantero, 1903)
Campsomeris peregrina (Lepeletier, 1845)
Campsomeris vitripennis (Smith, 1855)
Campsomeris whitelyi Kirby, 1889

References 

Parasitic wasps
Scoliidae
Hymenoptera genera
Taxa named by Amédée Louis Michel le Peletier